The 1985 French motorcycle Grand Prix was the eighth round of the 1985 Grand Prix motorcycle racing season. It took place on the weekend of 19–21 July 1985 at the Bugatti Circuit located in Le Mans.

Classification

500 cc

References

French motorcycle Grand Prix
French
Motorcycle Grand Prix